Metal Jukebox is a cover album by German power metal band Helloween. The song "Lay All Your Love on Me" was released as a single in Japan. Each member of the band recorded their instruments independently (and in different countries and studios) of each other and was later brought together at Andi Deris' Tenerife studio.

Track listing

Personnel
Andi Deris - vocals
Michael Weikath - guitar
Roland Grapow - guitar
Markus Grosskopf - bass
Uli Kusch - drums

Charts

References

Helloween albums
1999 albums
Covers albums